Kuhani (also Romanized as Kūhānī; also known as Kohni and Kuhni) is a village in Shaban Rural District, in the Central District of Nahavand County, Hamadan Province, Iran. At the 2006 census, its population was 2,528, in 687 families.

References 

Populated places in Nahavand County